Jean-Jacques Grasset (c.1769 – 25 August 1839) was a French classical violinist.

He was born in Paris about 1769, and was a pupil of Isidore Bertheaume. After several years' obligatory service in the army, he soon became well-known on his return. On the death of Pierre Gaviniès in 1800 he was appointed professor of the violin at the Conservatoire de Paris. Soon afterwards he succeeded Antonio Bartolomeo Bruni as chef d'orchestre at the Italian Opera, holding the post until 1829, when he retired from public life. He died in Paris in 1839.

He published three Concertos for the Violin, five books of Violin-Duos, and a Sonata for Piano and Violin.

References

Attribution

External links
 

1769 births
1839 deaths
Musicians from Paris
18th-century French male classical violinists
19th-century French male classical violinists
Academic staff of the Conservatoire de Paris